Time symmetry may refer to:

Time translation symmetry
Time reversal symmetry